Ishida (written:  lit. "stone ricefield") is a Japanese surname. The name is sometimes romanized as Isida. Notable people with the surname include:

, Japanese voice actor
, actress and singer
, Japanese singer
, Japanese idol and singer
, Japanese poet and writer
, Japanese actor and musician
, Japanese idol, singer, actress and voice actress
, Japanese actress
, Japanese actor and television personality
, Japanese sport wrestler
, killed by Sada Abe
, Japanese table tennis player
, Japanese volleyball player
Masatoshi Ishida (disambiguation), multiple people
, Japanese idol
 Mitsuhiro Ishida, Japanese mixed martial artist
, Japanese samurai
, Japanese shogi player
, Japanese boxer
, Japanese politician
, Japanese footballer
, Japanese manga artist
, Japanese voice actor
Tatsuya Ishida, Japanese webcomic author
, Japanese visual artist
, Japanese swimmer
Yoshio Ishida, Japanese Go player
Yoshihisa Ishida (born 1944), Japanese shot putter and hammer thrower
, Japanese footballer
, Japanese actress

References

Japanese-language surnames